Manfred Palmen (11 March 1945 – 18 November 2022) was a German politician. A member of the Christian Democratic Union, he served in the Landtag of North Rhine-Westphalia from 2000 to 2012.

Palmen died in Kleve on 18 November 2022, at the age of 77.

References

1945 births
2022 deaths
21st-century German politicians
Members of the Landtag of North Rhine-Westphalia
Christian Democratic Union of Germany politicians
University of Bonn alumni
People from Kaarst